California Proposition 66 may refer to:

 California Proposition 66 (2004)
 California Proposition 66 (2016)